Valdehorna is a municipality located in the province of Zaragoza, Aragon, Spain. According to the 2004 census (INE), the municipality has a population of 51 inhabitants.
The town is located near the Sierra de Santa Cruz.

References

Municipalities in the Province of Zaragoza